The 2005 Heineken Cup Final was the final match of the 2004–05 Heineken Cup, the tenth season of Europe's top club rugby union competition. The match was played on 22 May 2005 at Murrayfield Stadium in Edinburgh. The match was contested by Stade Français and Toulouse, both of France. Toulouse became the competition's first three-time champions, winning the match 18–12.

Match details

See also
2004–05 Heineken Cup

References

Final
2005
Heineken Cup Final
Heineken Cup Final
Heineken Cup Final 2005
Stade Français matches
Stade Toulousain matches
International sports competitions in Edinburgh
2000s in Edinburgh